Mason Wood (born 13 September 1993) is an Australian rules footballer who plays for the St Kilda Football Club in the Australian Football League (AFL), having previously played for the North Melbourne Football Club.

Career

North Melbourne 
Wood was drafted to North Melbourne with pick 41 in the 2012 AFL national draft after playing for the Geelong Falcons in the TAC Cup and representing Victoria Country at the 2012 AFL Under 18 Championships.  

Mason made his debut in the final game of the 2014 home and away season, kicking three goals, but was not selected during the finals.  

Wood had a breakout 2019 season, scoring 22 goals in 13 games (for nine wins), including a four-goal haul against eventual premiers Richmond in round 11. However, Wood still had an interrupted season due to a number of injuries.  

Wood played eight matches in 2020 in a Covid-interrupted season.

St Kilda 
In 2021, Wood was picked up as a rookie by  ahead of the 2021 season as part of the supplementary selection period (SSP). In February 2021, Wood kicked four goals against his former club in a Saints' practice match victory against the Kangaroos, which was won by 91 points. Wood also played in the final quarter of the Saints' win against Carlton in the Community Series in early March.

References

External links

1993 births
Living people
North Melbourne Football Club players
Werribee Football Club players
Geelong Falcons players
Australian rules footballers from Victoria (Australia)
St Kilda Football Club players
People educated at Geelong College